Belmond Le Manoir aux Quat' Saisons ("Four Seasons Manor", a.k.a. Le Manoir) is a luxury hotel-restaurant in the village of Great Milton near Oxford, in Oxfordshire, England. It is in a historic 15th-century manor house, near a church that was visited by Oliver Cromwell, In March 2014 the company owning the restaurant introduced a new brand name, Belmond. At this point the hotel changed its name to Belmond Le Manoir aux Quat'Saisons. In December 2018 Belmond was acquired by LVMH.

Description
The restaurant has two Michelin stars, as well as scoring 9/10 in the Good Food Guide It is capable of serving 260 guests per day It is owned by LVMH (since acquiring Belmond Ltd in December 2018) and run by the leading French chef Raymond Blanc. The executive chef is Luke Selby, having replaced Gary Jones who left the role in November 2022, after over 20 years. The head pastry chef is Benoit Blin. The gardens are used to grow fresh food for the restaurant. A helipad is available for clients.

The restaurant was used as filming location in the BBC 2 television programme The Restaurant, where it has been used for challenges as well as Raymond Blanc's "room of truth".

The restaurant kitchen has trained 34 Michelin starred chefs so far, with its basic training programs for its chefs lasting approximately 2.5 years. Each chef spending 6 months on each "section" in the kitchen. Chefs who stay longer than the initial 2.5 years of training then go on to learn the management side of the business.

Chefs trained at Le Manoir
Many notable chefs and restaurateurs were mentored by or worked for Raymond Blanc at Le Manoir, including:
John Burton-Race
Heston Blumenthal
Michael Caines
Elisha Carter
Éric Chavot
William Curley
JJ Goodman
David Goodridge
Paul Heathcote
Paul Liebrandt
David Moore
Marco Pierre White
James Knight-Pacheco

Reception
Restaurant critic Jay Rayner visited Le Manoir for the first time in 2013. Whilst he described it as possibly the most expensive restaurant in Britain, he praised the set up including the kitchen garden. Regarding the food, he praised a "pitch-perfect" beetroot terrine, which was served with a horseradish sorbet quenelle. He wondered at the skill involved in creating a dessert of poached meringue and fried apricots inside a globe of nougatine. He said that while he couldn't justify or excuse the expense, the meal was fabulous.

Public transport
Since June 2022, Le Manoir has subsidised a bus service between Great Milton and central Oxford. Oxford Bus Company route 46 links the village with central Oxford via Wheatley, Horspath and Cowley. Buses run hourly, seven days a week, from early morning until after midnight.

References

External links
 Official website

1984 establishments in England
Hotels in Oxfordshire
Belmond hotels
Restaurants in Oxfordshire
Michelin Guide starred restaurants in the United Kingdom
Culture in Oxfordshire
French restaurants in the United Kingdom